Ascential plc, formerly EMAP, is a British business-to-business media business specialising in exhibitions & festivals and information services. It is listed on the London Stock Exchange and is a constituent of the FTSE 250 Index.

History
Richard Winfrey purchased the Spalding Guardian in 1887 and later purchased the Lynn News and the Peterborough Advertiser; he also started the North Cambs Echo. He became a Liberal politician and campaigner for agricultural rights and the papers were used to promote his political views in and around Spalding, Boston, Sleaford and Peterborough. During World War II Winfrey's newspaper interests began to be passed over to his son, Richard Pattinson Winfrey (1902–1985). In 1947, under the direction of 'Pat' Winfrey, the family's newspaper titles were consolidated to form the East Midland Allied Press (EMAP): this was achieved by the merger of the Northamptonshire Printing and Publishing Co., the Peterborough Advertiser Co., the West Norfolk and King's Lynn Newspaper Co. and commercial printing sections at Rushden, King's Lynn and Bury St Edmunds.

The magazine division was founded on a hunch when the company's printing presses lay dormant between printing issues of the local papers. The staff gambled that a weekly angling publication would be a hit - and in 1953 Angling Times was born. This was soon joined by another weekly heavyweight when EMAP bought Motor Cycle News from its founder in 1956 for a hundred pounds. EMAP grew significantly in the late 1970s under the guidance of the extremely successful partnership of Sir Robin Miller and David Arculus. In 1996 EMAP agreed to sell its 65 newspaper titles, including the 300-year-old Stamford Mercury, to Johnston Press for £111 million.

Scottish Radio Holdings was acquired by EMAP on 21 June 2005. In 2006, EMAP sold its French division to Italy's Arnoldo Mondadori Editore. On 27 July 2007, EMAP announced that it was undertaking a review of the structure of the group in response to receiving a number of unsolicited proposals to purchase parts of the company. On 12 September 2007, EMAP announced that it had completed the disposal of its Australian consumer magazine division, Emap Australia for approximately £38m to ACP Magazines. On 29 January 2008, EMAP completed the sale of its radio, television and consumer media businesses (EMAP Radio) to German company Bauer for £1.14bn. The remainder of the company was taken over by Eden Bidco Ltd, a company incorporated for the purpose of the acquisition by its owners, the private equity investment group Apax and the Guardian Media Group in late March/early April 2008.

In March 2012, the company announced that it would be renamed Top Right Group, and that its magazines, events and data businesses would be separated into three standalone companies. The EMAP name would continue to be used for the magazines operation, which at the time accounted for around 18 percent of the group's turnover. The database business was renamed 4C Group, and the events unit was renamed I2i Events Group. Then in October 2015 the company announced that the EMAP brand would be scrapped as all its titles move to digital-only format.

In February 2015, Top Right Group sold Media Business Insight (including Broadcast, Shots and Screen International) to Mobeus Equity Partners and Tenzing PE.

In December 2015 Top Right Group rebranded as Ascential. The company was the subject of an £800m initial public offering in February 2016. The Guardian Media Group sold off its shares of Ascential in 2016 and 2017.

In June 2017, Ascential sold heritage brands (business-to-business titles) to Metropolis International. The transaction include the rights to EMAP name (as EMAP Publishing Ltd).

Acquisitions and sales 

2014
 Money 20/20 - Acquired

2015 
 Retail Net Group - Acquired

2016
 One Click Retail - Acquired

2017
 RWM - Sold
 Clavis Insight - Acquired
 MEED - Sold
 11 heritage brands - Sold
 MediaLink - Acquired
 HSJ - Sold

2018
 Brand View - Acquired
 WARC - Acquired
 Flywheel Digital - Acquired
 Exhibitions - Sold

Operations
Ascential operates four informational service categories focused on businesses in the digital economy. The four areas are product design, marketing, sales, and built environment and policy.

Product Design
 WGSN
 START by WGSN 

Marketing
 Cannes Lions
 Medialink
 WARC
 Siberia

Sales
 Edge by Ascential
 Money 20/20
 World Retail Congress
 Retail Week
 Flywheel
Built Environment and Policy
 DeHavilland
 Glenigan
 Groundsure

Previous publications

 Architects' Journal
 Architectural Review
 BIG!
 Business Matters
 Car
 Computer and Video Games
 Commodore User
 Construction News
 Datacom
 Drapers
 Eye magazine – Issue numbers 13–25, 1994–1997
 Ground Engineering
 Health Service Journal
 H&V News
 Internet Magazine
 J-17
 Local Government Chronicle
 Materials Recycling World
 Maximum
 Mean Machines
 MEED
 MEED Projects
 New Civil Engineer
 Nintendo Official Magazine
 Nursing Times
 PC Leisure
 PC Review
 PC User
 Pleine Vie
 Retail Week
 Refrigeration & Air Conditioning (RAC)
 Retail Jeweller
 Running Fitness
 Sega Saturn Magazine
 Sinclair User
 SKY Magazine
 Smash Hits
 SPORT
 ST Review
 The One
 The Face
 Which Computer?

References

External links
Ascential Official website
EMAP website

 
Companies based in the City of Westminster
British companies established in 1947
Publishing companies established in 1947
Companies listed on the London Stock Exchange
Apax Partners companies
Mass media in Peterborough
Companies based in Cambridgeshire
2016 initial public offerings